Petrolia is an unincorporated community in Allen County, Kansas, United States.  It is situated along the Neosho River.

History
In 1910, Petrolia had a money order postoffice, an express office, and was a trading point for the neighborhood. The population that year was 200.

Petrolia had a post office from July 1905 until September 1953.

Geography
Petrolia is located at  (37.7458767, -95.4716486), in Sections 31–32, Township 26 south, Range 18 east.  Less than a mile from the southern border of Allen County, it is situated west of the Neosho River and to the south of Scatter Creek.  Contained entirely within Logan Township, it is about 5 miles south-southwest of Humboldt and 13 miles from Iola (the county seat).  U.S. Route 169 crosses the Neosho River a mile to the south of Petrolia.

Education
The community is served by Chanute USD 413 public school district.

See also
 Great Flood of 1951

References

Further reading

External links
 Allen County maps: Current, Historic, KDOT

Unincorporated communities in Kansas
Unincorporated communities in Allen County, Kansas
1905 establishments in Kansas